The Roman Catholic Diocese of Charleston is an ecclesiastical territory, or diocese, of the Roman Catholic Church in the Southern United States that comprises the entire state of South Carolina. Currently, the diocese consists of 96 parishes and 21 missions, with Charleston as its see city. The bishop is Jacques Fabre-Jeune.

Charleston is a suffragan diocese of the Archdiocese of Atlanta. Services are primarily given in English throughout the diocese, though the rapid increase in the Hispanic population has caused several congregations to include Spanish language services, particularly in the Lowcountry region.

History

1820 to 1843 
The Diocese of Charleston is the seventh oldest Roman Catholic diocese in the United States, erected by Pope Pius VII on July 11, 1820.  He removed the states of Georgia, North Carolina, and South Carolina from the Archdiocese of Baltimore to form the new diocese. Pius VII designated the Diocese of Charleston as a suffragan diocese of the Archdiocese of Baltimore and appointed John England from the Diocese of Cork in Ireland as its first bishop.

Soon after his arrival in Charleston, England starting traveling through his large diocese to meet with his parishioners.  He went wherever he heard there were Catholics.  Once he found these groups, he ministered to their spiritual needs, appointed catechism teachers, and promoted the building of churches. During these pastoral visits, England preached in halls, court houses, and state houses.  He even preached in Protestant chapels and churches, sometimes at the invitation of their pastors. During his first years in the diocese, England traveled to Savannah and Augusta in Georgia and Columbia in  South Carolina. He spoke with African-Americans, Cherokees, Catholics who married non-Catholics and non-practicing Catholics.

When in Charleston, England preached at least twice every Sunday and delivered lectures on special occasions.  Experiencing a shortage of priests in the diocese, England established in 1832 the Philosophical and Classical College and Seminary of Charleston.  His plan was to support the seminary with income from the college. He taught college courses on the classics and theology. At its height, the college had 130 students.  However, the college raised alarms among some Protestant clergy in Charleston, who warned the public about so-called Papist conspiracies.  These attacks eventually reduced the college student body to 30. The seminary graduated many eminent laymen and priests. In the words of Chancellor Kent, "Bishop England revived classical learning in South Carolina".  In 1832, England estimated the Catholic population of the diocese at approximately 11,000, with 7,500 in South Carolina, 3,000 in Georgia, and 500 in North Carolina .

When in Charleston, England celebrated an early mass in the cathedral for African Americans every Sunday, preaching to them at the mass and at a Vesper service. He usually delivered two afternoon sermons; if unable to deliver both sermons, he would cancel the sermon for the rich and educated in favor of one for the poor. During the cholera and yellow fever epidemics in Charleston, England joined his priests and nuns in caring for the sick.

In 1834, England recruited a small group of Ursuline nuns from the convent at Blackrock, Cork to come to the diocese to teach and minister.  During this time, some slave owners invited England to their plantations to minister to their enslaved people. In 1835, provoked by the American Anti-Slavery Society, an anti-Catholic mob raided the Charleston post office.  The next day, the mob marched on England's school for 'children of color.'  However, the mob was thwarted by a group of Irish volunteers, led by England, who were guarding the school.  Yet soon after this, when all schools for 'free blacks' were closed in Charleston, England was forced to close his. However, he was able to continue the schools for mixed race students. England died in 1842.

1843 to 1950 
Pope Gregory XVI in 1843 appointed Ignatius Reynolds from the Archdiocese of Baltimore to replace England as bishop of Charleston. During his tenure, Reynolds brought stability to the diocesan administration. He conducted visitations of the entire diocese, which by 1846 included approximately 12,000 Catholics. Reynolds published a five-volume work on England and erased the $14,000 diocesan debt left by him.  On July 3, 1850, Pope Pius IX erected the Diocese of Savannah, removing Georgia from the Diocese of Charleston. Reynolds dedicated the Cathedral of Saint John and Saint Finbar in Charleston in April 1854.  Reynolds died in 1855.

In 1855, Pius IX appointed Patrick Lynch as the new Bishop of Charleston. A fire in December 1861 destroyed the Cathedral of Saint John and Saint Finbar, the bishop's residence, and the diocesan library. In addition, the artillery bombardment of Charleston by the Union Army for nearly two years during the American Civil War closed most of the churches and impoverished their congregations.

The 1865 burning of Columbia, South Carolina by the Union Army destroyed St. Mary's College, the Sisters' Home, and the Ursuline Convent.  By the end of the war in 1865, the diocesan debt exceeded $200,000. Lynch began soliciting donations throughout the country for the immediate needs of his diocese and to pay off its debt. On March 3, 1868, Pius IX erected the Vicariate Apostolic of North Carolina, removing the state of North Carolina from the Diocese of Charleston. The diocese of Charleston now consisted only of South Carolina.  Lynch died in 1882.

Pope Leo XIII appointed Henry P. Northrop, then serving as vicar apostolic of North Carolina, to also served as bishop of Charlotte in 1883.  Northrup gave up his post as vicar apostolic in 1888 to only serve in the Diocese of Charleston.  When Northrup died in 1916, Pope Benedict XV named William Russell as the new bishop of Charleston. After Russell's death in 1927, Pope Pius XI appointed Emmet M. Walsh of the Diocese of Savannah as his successor. During his 22-year tenure in Charleston, Walsh erected 25 new churches, four new hospitals, and two vacation camps for youth.

1950 to present 
After appointing Walsh as coadjutor bishop for the Diocese of Youngstown in 1949, Pope Pius XII named John Russell of the Archdiocese of Baltimore in 1950 to succeed him in Charleston. In 1958, Pius XII appointed him as Bishop of Richmond and named Paul Hallinan as the new bishop of the Diocese of Charleston.

Recognized as one of the South's "foremost advocates of social and religious liberalism", Hallinan became known for his personal dedication to the civil rights movement and the cause of racial equality. In February 1961, he issued a pastoral letter in which he wrote, "With racial tension mounting, the Church must speak out clearly. In justice to our people, we cannot abandon leadership to the extremists whose only creed is fear and hatred." However, Hallinan delayed full racial integration at Catholic institutions in the diocese out of fear for the safety of African American students. Explaining this decision, he said, "The Catholics are 1.3% of the population in our state. If the full federal power cannot carry this off, it's fatuous to think we can. I would take the risk on high moral principles, but it would be a hollow victory if it wrecked our school system or did harm to our children."On February 10, 1962, Pope John XXIII elevated the Diocese of Atlanta to the Archdiocese of Atlanta.  He transferred the Diocese of Charleston from the Archdiocese of Baltimore to the new archdiocese. At the same time, he appointed Hallinan as the first archbishop of Atlanta and replaced him in Charleston with Francis Reh of the Archdiocese of New York.  Pope Paul VI appointed Reh in 1964 as rector of the Pontifical North American College in Rome.  The pope named Auxiliary Bishop Ernest Unterkoefler from the Diocese of Richmond to replace Reh.

An active participant in the American civil rights movement, Unterkoefler worked alongside Dr. Martin Luther King Jr. and ended racial segregation in all Catholic institutions in the diocese. Unterkoefler was also a prominent advocate for restoring the permanent diaconate in the United States, and ordained Joseph Kemper in 1971 as the first permanent deacon in the United States.

In 1989, Pope John Paul II appointed David B. Thompson of the Archdiocese of Phlladelphia to assist Unterkoefler as a coadjutor bishop. After serving for 26 years as bishop of Charleston, Unterkoefler resigned in 1990 and Thompson automatically succeeded him.  Thompson retired as bishop in 1999; John Paul II replaced him with Robert Baker from the Diocese of St. Augustine. During his tenure as bishop, Baker dedicated new or expanded churches, schools, and parish facilities. Baker was named bishop of the Diocese of Birmingham by Pope Benedict XVI in 2007.

In 2009, Benedict XVI appointed Robert Guglielmone from the Diocese of Rockville Centre as the new bishop of Charleston.  He retired in 2020 and was replaced by Pope Francis with Jacques Fabre-Jeune of the Diocese of Brooklyn.  Fabre-Jeune is the current bishop of Charleston and the first African American to hold that post.  In 2021, the diocese joined other Catholic institutions in suing the State of South Carolina in federal court.  The issue was a provision in the South Carolina Constitution forbidding the use of public funds for private schools.  This provision was blocking the diocese from receiving grants from the 2020 Federal CARES Act

Cathedrals
Consecrated on April 6, 1854, the Cathedral of Saint John and Saint Finbar was the first proper cathedral of the diocese. On December 11, 1861, it was destroyed in a fire that consumed most of Charleston.  The Cathedral of Saint John the Baptist was built to replace the original cathedral and sits on the foundation of its ruins. Before the Diocese of Raleigh was formed, the Diocese of Charleston had a pro-cathedral in Wilmington, North Carolina, that is now St. Mary Catholic Church.

Sexual abuse
In 2007, Bishop Baker agreed to pay a settlement of $12 million to victims of sexual abuse by priests serving in the Diocese of Charleston. In March 2019, the diocese unveiled the names of 42 diocesan clergy who were "credibly accused" of committing acts of sex abuse. In August 2019, it was revealed that Bishop Guglielmone was being sued in the state of New York for sexual abuse he allegedly committed while serving in the Diocese of Rockville Centre.

In November 2020, Jacob Ouellette, the director of youth ministry at Our Lady of the Sea Parish in North Myrtle Beach, South Carolina, was arrested on charges of criminal sexual conduct, two counts of criminal solicitation of a minor, and first-degree sexual exploitation of a minor on the Internet. In January 2023, a Vatican-ordered investigation into the charges against Guglielmone found no substance to them.

List of bishops
The complete list of bishops of the diocese is as follows:

Bishops of Charleston
 John England (1820-1842)  - William Clancy (coadjutor bishop 1834-1837; appointed apostolic vicar of British Guiana before succession)
 Ignatius A. Reynolds (1843-1855)
 Patrick N. Lynch (1857-1882)
 Henry P. Northrop (1883-1916)
 William Thomas Russell (1916-1927)
 Emmet M. Walsh (1927-1949), appointed coadjutor bishop of Youngstown and subsequently succeeded to that see
 John J. Russell (1950-1958), appointed bishop of Richmond
 Paul John Hallinan (1958-1962), appointed archbishop of Atlanta
 Francis Frederick Reh (1962-1964), appointed rector of the Pontifical North American College in Rome and later bishop of Saginaw
 Ernest Leo Unterkoefler (1964-1990)
 David B. Thompson (1990-1999; coadjutor bishop 1989-1990)
 Robert J. Baker (1999-2007), appointed bishop of Birmingham
 Robert E. Guglielmone (2009–2022)
 Jacques E. Fabre, (2022–present)

Other diocesan priests who became bishops
 John Barry, appointed bishop of Savannah in 1857
 Joseph Bernardin, appointed auxiliary bishop of Atlanta in 1966, archbishop of Cincinnati in 1972, and archbishop of Chicago in 1982; became cardinal in 1983.
 John James Joseph Monaghan, appointed bishop of Wilmington in 1897
 John Moore, appointed bishop of Saint Augustine in 1877
 (Abbot Emeritus Edmund F. McCaffrey was incardinated in this diocese in 1993.)

Departments

Magazine
The Catholic Miscellany, successor to the U.S. Catholic Miscellany, the first Catholic newspaper in the United States, is the diocese's official magazine.

Office of Vocations
 The Drexel House - Catholic residence for youth ministry teams in downtown Charleston, SC
 Vicar of Vocations:
 Richard D. Harris - 2004 - 2010; interim vicar for vocations, 2020–2021
 Jeffrey Kirby -  2010 - 2015
 Mark Good -  2015 - 2019
 S. Matthew Gray -  2019 - 2021
 Rhett Williams -  2021–present

Schools 
Secretary of Education: William Ryan

Diocesan high schools
 Bishop England High School – Charleston
 Cardinal Newman School – Columbia
 St. John Paul II Catholic School – Okatie (Beaufort and Jasper counties)

Private high schools
 St. Joseph's Catholic School – Greenville
 St. Anne Catholic High School – Rock Hill
 St. Elizabeth Ann Seton Catholic High School – Myrtle Beach, South Carolina

Parochial elementary schools
 Saint John Catholic School – North Charleston
 Blessed Sacrament School – Charleston
 Charleston Catholic School – Charleston
 Christ Our King-Stella Maris School – Mount Pleasant
 Nativity School – Charleston
 St. John Neumann Catholic School – Columbia
 St. Joseph Catholic School – Columbia
 St. Joseph Catholic School – Anderson
 St. Martin de Porres Catholic School – Columbia
 St. Mary Help of Christians Catholic School – Aiken
 St. Peter Catholic School – Columbia
 Summerville Catholic School – Summerville
 Prince of Peace Catholic School – Taylors
 St. Paul the Apostle Catholic School – Spartanburg
 St. Francis by the Sea Catholic School – Hilton Head
 St. Anthony Catholic School - Florence
 St. Anne Catholic School - Sumter
 St. Peter Catholic School – Beaufort
 St. Gregory the Great Catholic School – Bluffton
 St. Mary's Catholic School – Greenville
 Our Lady of the Rosary Catholic School – Greenville
 St. Anthony's Catholic School – Greenville
 St. Michael's Catholic School - Garden City
 Divine Redeemer Catholic School - Hanahan
 Our Lady of Peace Catholic School - North Augusta
 Holy Trinity Catholic School - Longs

See also

 Historical list of the Catholic bishops of the United States
 List of Roman Catholic archdioceses (by country and continent)
 List of Roman Catholic dioceses (alphabetical) (including archdioceses)
 List of Roman Catholic dioceses (structured view) (including archdioceses)
 List of Roman Catholic Churches in the Diocese of Charleston
 The Catholic Miscellany

References

External links
Roman Catholic Diocese of Charleston Official Site
The Catholic Miscellany, Official Magazine of the Roman Catholic Diocese of Charleston

 
Charleston
Catholic Church in South Carolina
Religious organizations established in 1820
Charleston
Charleston
1820 establishments in South Carolina